Albert Emon (born 24 June 1953) is French football manager and former player. He was most recently in charge of the Ligue 1 club AC Ajaccio.

Club career
As a player, Emon won the Ligue 1 with Olympique de Marseille in 1972 and the Coupe de France in 1980 with AS Monaco. Emon also played for Stade de Reims and Olympique Lyonnais.

International career
Emon won eight caps and scored one goal for the France national team.

Coaching career
Emon coached Olympique Marseille in 2007 before being replaced by Eric Gerets. On 7 June 2009, he signed a three-year contract with AS Cannes.

References

External links
 
 
Profile at French federation official site

1953 births
Living people
Association football forwards
French footballers
France international footballers
Olympique de Marseille players
Stade de Reims players
AS Monaco FC players
Olympique Lyonnais players
SC Toulon players
AS Cannes players
Ligue 1 players
Ligue 2 players
French football managers
OGC Nice managers
SC Toulon managers
Olympique de Marseille managers
AS Cannes managers
Ligue 1 managers
Sportspeople from Bouches-du-Rhône
Footballers from Provence-Alpes-Côte d'Azur